Poojya Doddappa Appa College of Engineering, Gulbarga was founded in the year 1958 by the Hyderabad Karnataka Education society. The college is affiliated to Visvesvaraya Technological University and approved by AICTE. It is the first college to start Ceramics and Cement Technology course in South India and Electronics and Communication department in Karnataka. Initial intake was 120 with degree offering in civil, mechanical and electrical now it offers 11 Bachelor with 980 intake, 10 Master with 193 intake and 7 Research Programmes in the various specialties of Engineering.

See also
 Education in India
 Literacy in India
 Degrees in India

External links
Official website
AICTE website
VTU website

Engineering colleges in Karnataka
Education in Kalaburagi
Universities and colleges in Kalaburagi district
Companies based in Kalaburagi